The People's Police is the national civilian police force of the People's Republic of China. Police in China have a variety of roles in addition to enforcing the law, they are also responsible for the maintenance of social stability, and in this sense policing in China performs not just a law enforcement function but a political function as well. The majority of national police forces are under the jurisdiction of the Ministry of Public Security (MPS).

Over the years, the power of the police has gradually been expanded to border control, under the auspices of the China Immigration Inspection (CII), household registration, issuance of the National ID card (see: Resident Identity Card) and cybersecurity (under the 11th Bureau of the MPS), network security and website registration.

History
Formed in October 1949, with the establishment of the People's Republic of China and under the control of the Chinese Communist Party (CCP), the police force in China was part of the Ministry of Public Security (MPS) and its first official name was not "police", but "Public Security", while police officers were called "public security guards" (hence, even today, police stations in China are still known as public security bureaus). This created some confusion, because the People's Liberation Army (PLA) had its own "Chinese People's Public Security Force", which later evolved into today's People's Armed Police (PAP). 

The influence of the Soviet Union was paramount in the early years of the People's Republic, and guided the Chinese approach to policing. During the Cultural Revolution (1966–76), the powers of the police were both strengthened and weakened; on the one hand, they were given control over much of the judicial system, since People's Courts and People's Procuratorates basically collapsed, meaning that local directors of public security bureaus could easily arrest and convict almost any person they chose; on the other hand, the top leadership of the police was almost totally purged and persecuted, and political commissars from the PLA (most of them hand-picked by the Cultural Revolution Group) were brought in to take control over the largest and most important public security bureaus, including those of Beijing and Shanghai.

The current structure and mission of the People's Police was formalized in the Police Law of the People's Republic of China (February 1995), which states:

Branches 
According to the Police Law of the People's Republic of China (1995), the People's Police comprises four components:
 Public Security Police, under the control of the MPS (comprising the majority of the national police force);
 State Security Police, under the control of the Ministry of State Security (MSS);
 Prison Police, under the control of the Ministry of Justice (MOJ);
 Judicial Police, working under People's Courts and People's Procuratorates.

Public Security Police 
The Public Security Police forces comprise the vast majority of police in China and fall under the authority of the MPS. Departments include:
 Criminal Investigations (5th Bureau of the Ministry of Public Security).
 Economic Crimes (2nd Bureau of the Ministry of Public Security).
 Political Security Police : responsible for maintaining social and political stability, upholding the political principles established by the Constitution, and handling cases that undermine national and cultural unity (1st Bureau of the Ministry of Public Security, with some tasks falling under the 4th Bureau, specifically those having to do with investigating religious activities and cults)
 Public Order: Responsible for preventing, detecting and stopping illegal crimes and violent behaviour, handling mass incidents such as assemblies, demonstrations and maintaining order in public places, managing special industries and dangerous goods, and handling public security administrative law enforcement cases (3rd Bureau of the Ministry of Public Security)
 Railway Police (10th Bureau of the Ministry of Public Security)
 Food and Forestry Police: responsible for issues of food, the ecological environment, forest and grassland, and biological safety cases (7th Bureau of the Ministry of Public Security)
 Anti-Narcotics Force (21st Bureau of the Ministry of Public Security)
 Special Service Police: responsible for the security tasks of Communist Party and State leaders, major provincial leaders and important visiting foreign guests (8th Bureau of the Ministry of Public Security)
 Public Information Network Security Police: responsible for monitoring the contents of public Internet websites, e-mails, chat messages and visitation records (11th Bureau of the Ministry of Public Security)
 13th Bureau of the Ministry of Public Security: responsible for the management of prisons and detention centers that fall under the Ministry of Public Security (note that the majority of prisons instead fall under the MOJ, which has its own, different, Prison Police)
 Traffic Police (17th Bureau of the Ministry of Public Security)
 Foreign Affairs Police: responsible for the security of foreign embassies in China and for liaison work in Chinese embassies and consulates abroad (19th Bureau of the Ministry of Public Security)
 Household Registration Police, responsible for maintaining household registration and administering the Hukou system 
 Patrol Police (ordinary patrol activities) 
 Port Police
 Immigration or Border Inspection Police operating as CII (itself a child agency of the Ministry of Public Security)
 Customs Anti-Smuggling Police: responsible for handling customs smuggling cases, in collaboration with the Anti-Smuggling Bureau of the General Administration of Customs (14th Bureau of the Ministry of Public Security)
 Civil Aviation Police: responsible for handling administrative law enforcement cases in the air and at airports, maintaining civil aviation flight safety and handling hijacking and other sudden air security situations, in collaboration with the Civil Aviation Administration of China (15th Bureau of the Ministry of Public Security)

State Security Police 
Refers to those police forces controlled by the MSS. They generally perform "secret police" duties and help maintain social stability and preserve the power of the ruling Chinese Communist Party (note that despite having police and military officers serving in it, the MSS is a civilian agency).

In official parlance, State Security Police are responsible for "detecting, suppressing, and eliminating all counter-revolutionary organizations and activities, defending the people's power, and maintaining political security".

State Security Police should not be confused with the 1st Bureau of the MPS (described above in the Public Security Police section), despite sometimes similar duties and overlapping missions.

Prison Police 
Prison police are responsible for prison security, perform prison guard duties and assist in prison administration. They are similar to correctional officers in other countries.

Judicial Police 
Judicial police are responsible for the security of People's Courts and People's Procuratorates at the city, municipal and township levels. They belong to the judicial system and maintain order and security in courthouses and assist judges and prosecutors in judicial investigations.

Ranks
The rank system of the People's Police is as follows:

See also 
 Public security bureau
 People's Armed Police
 People's Public Security University of China

References 

Law enforcement agencies of China
Law enforcement in communist states